Queen Air (Aeronaves Queen SA) was an airline based at Las Americas International Airport, in Santo Domingo, Dominican Republic. It began operations in 1998, but ceased these in 1999. In 2002 it was acquired by the Michigan-based Viva Air/Auxer Group. An attempt to restart operations with a single Lockheed Tristar in 2004 was unsuccessful.

Fleet
 1 Airbus A320
 1 Lockheed L-1011 TriStar

Two McDonnell Douglas DC-9s were ordered but not delivered.

Code data

IATA Code: OQ
ICAO Code: QNA
Callsign: Queen Air

References

Defunct airlines of the Dominican Republic
Airlines established in 1998
Airlines disestablished in 1999